is a Japanese voice actress from Chiba Prefecture who is affiliated with 81 Produce. She started her career as a member of the idol and voice acting group Wake Up, Girls!, which was active from 2014 to 2018. She is also known for roles such as Hacka Doll #1 in Hacka Doll and Shinobu Inoyose in D4DJ.

Biography
Takagi was born in Sendai, Miyagi Prefecture on September 8, 1996. She later moved to Chiba Prefecture.

Takagi's career began after passing an audition to become part of the idol mixed-media project Wake Up, Girls!. Apart from becoming a member of the real-life group, she was cast as the character Miyu Okamoto. Takagi would play the character in the project's anime series, which aired in 2014. She ultimately remained with the project until the group's dissolution in 2017.

In 2014, Takagi was cast as Hacka Doll #1 in the mixed-media project Hacka Doll. In 2015, she was appointed as a tourism ambassador for Iida, Nagano.

After Wake Up, Girls! disbanded, Takagi continued her voice acting activities. In 2020, she was cast as Shinobu Inoyose in the mixed-media project D4DJ.

Filmography

Anime
2014
Wake Up, Girls!, Miyu Okamoto

2015
Hacka Doll: The Animation, Hacka Doll #1

2017
Anime-Gatari, Matsuri Toda

2019
Cinderella Nine, Koko Aisaka

2020
D4DJ First Mix, Shinobu Inoyose

2021
D4DJ Petit Mix, Shinobi Inoyose

2022
Healer Girl, Shinobu Honosaka

2023
In Another World with My Smartphone 2nd Season, Lucia Rea Regulus

Games
2015
Sword Art Online: Lost Song, Nijika Karatachi (Rain)

2022
Girls' Frontline, SuperNova

References

External links
Agency profile 

1996 births
81 Produce voice actors
Japanese voice actresses
Voice actresses from Chiba Prefecture
Voice actresses from Sendai
Living people